East Mills Community School District or East Mills Schools is a rural public school district headquartered in Hastings, Iowa, United States. The district is mostly in Mills County, with small portions in Montgomery County. It serves the communities of Hastings, Emerson, Henderson, and Malvern.

History
East Mills Schools formed on July 1, 2011, from the merger of the Malvern Community School District and the Nishna Valley Community School District. Voters in both districts approved the consolidation on a 6 to 1 basis in 2010; 19.2% of the registered voters in the districts, a total of 483 people, participated in that election. The merger was done so the school system could keep classes and teachers.

In 2014, the district had a total of 494 students.

It previously operated Chantry Elementary School in Malvern, but the district closed the school in 2014.

Schools
The district operates two schools on one campus in Hastings:
East Mills Elementary School
East Mills Junior/Senior High School

East Mills High School

Athletics
The Wolverines compete in the Corner Conference in the following sports:
Cross Country (boys and girls)
Volleyball
Football
Basketball (boys and girls)
Wrestling 
Track and Field (boys and girls)
Baseball 
Softball
Rugby

See also
List of school districts in Iowa
List of high schools in Iowa

References

Further reading

External links
 East Mills Community School District
 "Facility Evaluation & Planning For East Mills Community School District." Iowa Schoolhouse Construction & Planning Services, Iowa School Construction Administration Services LLC (Jefferson, Iowa). July 2014.

School districts in Iowa
Education in Mills County, Iowa
Education in Montgomery County, Iowa
School districts established in 2011
2011 establishments in Iowa